Regional Transportation Agency of Central Maryland, locally referred to as the RTA, is a transit organization developed to establish a more effective and efficient public transportation system across Central Maryland.  The RTA is made up of multiple jurisdictions including Anne Arundel County, Howard County, City of Laurel and Northern Prince George's County.  The RTA combined the management and administrative functions of multiple transit operations, reducing operating costs by over 10%,  and provided a better customer service experience by improving connections across Central Maryland. The Commission allows all of the participating jurisdictions the ability to oversee transit management operations.

In 2014, Howard County initiated the Regional Transit Agency of Central Maryland, recruiting Anne Arundel County to join areas served by Central Maryland Regional Transit claiming the centralized authority initiated, managed and funded through Howard County would save money in contract expenses. CMRT bid on providing services to these regions after July 1, but lost to First Transit.

In 2014, Howard County broke ground on a $7.2 million bus terminal at Savage, Maryland designed to house 120 buses.

System

, RTA operates 16 bus routes in Howard County, Anne Arundel County, Prince George's County, and the city of Laurel.

Hubs
RTA has a number of transit hubs where numerous bus lines meet. They include:
Arundel Mills
Mall in Columbia
Town Centre Laurel

Fares
Bus fare can be purchased on the bus, at certain library branches, senior centers, and online.

References

External links
 

Bus transportation in Maryland
Savage, Maryland